Afrodisiac is an album by Nigerian Afrobeat composer, bandleader, and multi-instrumentalist Fela Kuti, originally released on the Nigerian EMI label in 1973. The album's four tracks were re-recordings of Nigerian 45s redone in London in 1972. The album features Kuti's first Nigerian hit "Jeun Ko Ku," which sold over 200,000 copies.

AllMusic stated that "These four workouts [...] are propulsive mixtures of funk and African music, avoiding the homogeneity of much funk and African records of later vintage, done with nonstop high energy. The interplay between horns, electric keyboards, drums, and Fela's exuberant vocals gives this a jazz character, without sacrificing the earthiness that makes it danceable as well".

The album later served as both an inspiration and a template for American post-punk band Talking Heads' 1980 album Remain in Light.

Track listing
All compositions by Fela Kuti.
 "Alu Jon Jonki Jon" – 12:41
 "Jeun Ko Ku (Chop & Quench)" – 7:14
 "Eko Ile" – 6:41
 "Je'nwi Temi (Don't Gag Me)" – 13:15

Personnel
Fela Kuti – tenor saxophone, alto saxophone, electric piano, vocals
Eddie Faychum, Tunde Williams – trumpet
Igo Chico – tenor saxophone
Lekan Animashaun – baritone saxophone
Peter Animashaun – guitar
Maurice Ekpo – bass guitar
Tony Allen – drums
Tony Abayomi – percussion
Isaac Olaleye – shekere
Henry Koffi, Akwesi Korranting, Friday Jumbo – congas

References

Fela Kuti albums
1973 albums
Afrobeat albums
EMI Records albums
Yoruba-language albums
Albums produced by Jeff Jarratt (producer)